The Mahâ Adigâr (also known as Adikārama, Adikār) was a Great Officer in the Amātya Mandalaya, or Sinhalese Council of State, in the Sinhalese Kingdoms of monarchical Sri Lanka. The office was second in power and dignity to the King. Like many of the existing high offices at the time it had combined legislative and judicial powers and functioned primarily equivalent to that of a prime minister and chief justice, but also had duties in the governance of a province. During the Kandyan period there were two Adigars, who were styled Mahâ Nilames (Grand Officers), the Pallegampahê Mahâ Nilamê and the Udagampahê Mahâ Nilamê, the former taking precedence over the latter.

History
The constitution and laws derived by the earlier kings of Anuradhapura, Polonnaruwa and Dambadeniya guided the later kings of Kotte and Kandy in accordance with the Lex non scripta of the country. In most instances it is believed that these customary laws, dating from remote antiquity, to have been originated from the ancient written laws of which no records have remained. No regular records remain owing, in all probability, to the wanton destruction of literary records and libraries during the several invasions from the continent of India. One most devastating example committed by the Cholas at the beginning of the thirteenth century where the island suffered irreparable losses both from a literary and political point of view, due to the furious destruction of the invaders.

In the Sinhalese Kingdom the Monarch was the absolute ruler, however the monarch was assisted in the exercise of the functions of government by the Amātya Mandalaya which was headed by the Mahâ Adigârs, a position equivalent to that of a prime minister. By the Kandyan period there existed two Adigars who were styled Mahâ Nilames (Grand Officers), the Pallegampahê Mahâ Nilamê and the Udagampahê Mahâ Nilamê, the former taking precedence over the latter, though remaining equal in power. These names were derived from the districts under the Rājākariya, where services due from the inhabitants of these areas having been given to the two Adigârs.

Following the expansion of British rule into the provinces of the former Kandyan Kingdom, since 1815 the British retained the office of Adigar appointing Kandyans loyal to the British Crown. Although the office remained a powerful one till the late 19th century, it soon became an honorary post and title. The last to hold the title was Sir Tikiri Bandara Panabokke, who was appointed to the honorary post of First Adigar in 1940. After his death in 1963 no appointments were made.

Functions
The Mahâ Adigâr was second in power and dignity to the monarch, and there was usually two in number who possessed equal powers. Like many of the other high offices in the country the Mahâ Adigâr had combined legislative and judicial powers. They acted as judges to the Wahal Habe (the King's Court) and also had the command of the guards called Katupulle, and would act as chief of the military and on field commanders during military campaigns.

Though the office was very powerful, his emoluments and influence was less than that of a Mahâ Dissâva, a provincial governor, so the government of a province was added to his office of Adigâr. Being Prime Minister also, the Adigâr would reside in the city which was the seat of government, however according to Kandyan law his wife and children would be taken as hostage for his good conduct, during his absence, whenever he visited the provinces over which he was Dissava.

The Adigâr signed all land grants made by the King and appointed junior officers.

Tenure
There was no time limit for the office holder as he held the post at the pleasure of the King, which meant throughout his life, if not incurred the displeasure of the King. It was not hereditary, although members of the same family have been appointed.

Wealth
With his appointment into office the Adigar would have to pay the king, his appointee, five hundred "Silver Coins", and a similar sum every new year (dakum). However he would in turn receive large sums of money through junior officers he has appointed receiving around 10 silver coins per year from them. The Adigar further received a portion of fines collected, income from ferries operated, and from liberated prisoners.

List of Maha Adigars

Pallegampahê Mahâ Nilamê
 Pilimatalavuva Arava Tikiribandara (1765–1773)
 Pilimatalavuva Vijesundara Mudiyanse (1778–1789)
 Pilimatalavuva (1790–1811)
 Ehelepola Nilame (1811–1814) - Instrumental in the demise of the Kingdom of Kandy
 Molligoda (1814–?) - Singularity to the Kandyan Convention, Dissawa of the Satkorale

Udagampahê Mahâ Nilamê
 Pilimatalavuva Arava Tikiribandara (1738–1762)
 Pilimatalavuva Vijesundara Mudiyanse (1773–1778)
 Pilimatalavuva (1787–1790)
 Pilimatalavuva Vijesumdara Rajakaruna Navaratna Attanayake Bandaranayaka Mudiyanse Ralahamy (1805–14, 1815–18)
 Ehelepola Nilame (?–1811) - Instrumental in the demise of the Kingdom of Kandy
 Molligoda (1811–1814) - Singularity to the Kandyan Convention, Dissawa of the Satkorale
 Ratwatte Nilame (1825–1827) - Dissawa of Matale and signatory of the Kandyan Convention

Unknown dates
 Angammana - Succeeded Pilimatalava.
 Galagoda - member of the Galagoda family, father of Galagoda, Dissawa of Nuwarakalawiya.

Titular
 S. N. W. Hulugalle Adigar (1906–1915) - member of the Legislative Council of Ceylon
 J. H. Meedeniya Adigar - member of the Legislative Council of Ceylon
 Sir Tikiri Bandara Panabokke Adigar - member of the Legislative Council, first Minister of Health in the State Council and second representative of the Government of Ceylon to India
 Sir Cuda Ratwatte Adigar - first elected Mayor of Kandy and member of the State Council of Ceylon
 J. C. Ratwatte Adigar - member of the State Council
 Lawrence Nugawela Adigar - Rate Mahatmaya of Katugampola Hatpattu in Kurunegala District, was honored with the rank of Disawa and was awarded the rank of Second Adigar on his retirement from Government Service

See also
 Radala
 Sri Lankan titles

References

Citations

Bibliography

Adigar
Officers of the Kingdom of Kandy
Titles in British Ceylon